This list of educational institutions in Lyngby-Taarbæk Municipality is a list of educational institutions in Lyngby-Taarbæk Municipality, Greater Copenhagen, Denmark. It includes primary, secondary and higher educational institutions.

Higher education
 Technical University of Denmark
 Maskinmesterskolen i København

Secondary education
 Lyngby Gymnasium
 Virum Gymnasium

Primary education

Public schools

Private and charter schools

References

Education in Lyngby-Taarbæk Municipality